State Route 388 (SR 388) is a  state highway that travels south-to-north in a backward L-shape, completely within Columbia County, in the east-central part of the state of Georgia. It connects Grovetown to Lewiston.

Route description

SR 388 begins at an intersection with SR 223 and the eastern terminus of Harlem–Grovetown Road in Grovetown. Here, SR 388 is known as Wrightsboro Road, a major urban corridor farther to the east in Augusta. SR 223 north of here is also known as Wrightsboro Road, but is known as West Robinson Avenue southeast of here. SR 388 travels to the northeast and passes Goodale Park. At an intersection with Whiskey Road, it begins a curve to the east. This  section of roadway is lined with numerous businesses on both sides. It then intersects the northern terminus of Katherine Street and the southern terminus of Horizon South Parkway. Here, SR 388 turns left onto Horizon South Parkway, while Wrightsboro Road continues to the east toward Augusta. SR 388 takes Horizon South Parkway to the north-northeast.

It leaves the city limits of Grovetown just before passing a campus of Augusta Technical College and crossing over Mill Branch. It passes the Horizon South industrial complex, which includes a John Deere location, a Serta plant, and Palmetto Industries. Access is provided via Horizon West Parkway. Just after this intersection, the highway curves to the northwest. A short distance later, it curves to the north-northwest and has an interchange with Interstate 20 (I-20; Carl Sanders Highway) and its internal designation of SR 402. Here, the roadway crosses over the Interstate highway on the Lieutenant General James E. Gray Memorial Bridge and becomes known as Lewiston Road. It curves to the north-northeast just south of an intersection with the southern terminus of William Few Parkway and the western terminus of Sugarcreek Drive. At an intersection with the eastern terminus of Mill Creek Lane, it curves back to the north-northwest. A short distance later, SR 388 meets its northern terminus, an intersection with SR 232 (Columbia Road). Here, the roadway continues as Hereford Farm Road, which leads to Evans. SR 388 connects SR 223 and SR 232, which travel parallel to each other on opposite sides of I-20 in southern Columbia County. This highway and Hereford Farm Road also serve to connect Grovetown and Evans.

History

The road that would eventually become SR 388 was built in 1965 along the same alignment as it travels today. By 1991, the road was designated as SR 388. In 2004, it was extended along Hereford Farm Road. In 2007, it was removed from Hereford Farm Road.

Future
All of SR 388, from Wrightsboro Road in Grovetown to SR 232 in Lewiston, will be widened into a four-lane road that includes a median, bike lanes, turning lanes, and sidewalks. SR 388 will also have a diverging diamond interchange with I-20 in the future.

Hereford Farm Road has been proposed to have a widening project, as well. It will be widened from a two-lane undivided highway to a four-lane divided highway. Once the Hereford Farm Road widening project is completed, SR 388 will probably be extended to Evans and have its future northern terminus at SR 383 (North Belair Road) or at SR 104 (Washington Road).

Major intersections

Related routes

Harlem–Grovetown Road

Harlem–Grovetown Road is the name for what is essentially a southern extension of SR 388 (Wrightsboro Road), from the latter highway's southern terminus in Grovetown. As its name suggests, it serves to connect traffic from Harlem to Grovetown. Harlem–Grovetown Road is a  route. Even though Georgia does not sign its county highways, except for on green street signs, Harlem–Grovetown Road is Columbia County Route 575 (CR 575).

The highway begins at an intersection with US 221/SR 47 (North Louisville Street) in Harlem and travels to the east-northeast. A short distance later, it leaves the city limits of Harlem and then crosses over Euchee Creek. After an intersection with Old Louisville Road, the road curves to the north-northeast. In Grovetown, it passes the Grovetown Trails at Euchee Creek, Grovetown Middle School, and Cedar Ridge Elementary School, just before meeting its eastern terminus, an intersection with SR 223 (known as Wrightsboro Road northwest of the intersection and West Robinson Avenue southeast of it) and the southern terminus of SR 388 (Wrightsboro Road).

Hereford Farm Road

Hereford Farm Road is the name for what is essentially a northern and eastern extension of SR 388 (Lewiston Road), from the latter highway's northern terminus in Lewiston. It serves to connect traffic from SR 388 to Evans. Hereford Farm Road is a  route. Even though Georgia does not sign its county highways, except for on green street signs, Hereford Farm Road is Columbia County Route 102 (CR 102).

The highway begins at an intersection with SR 232 (Columbia Road) and the northern terminus of SR 388 (Lewiston Road) in Lewiston and travels to the north-northwest. Almost immediately, it passes Lewiston Elementary School. Just south of Innisbrook Drive, it curves back to the north-northeast. The road then curves to the southeast and to the east-northeast. Just after crossing over Tudor Branch, the highway begins skirting the northwestern edge of the city limits of Evans. Between an intersection with the southern terminus of Blanchard Road and one with the northern terminus of Cedric Way, it passes by Evans Middle School. While passing the school, it curves to the east-southeast. Just west of an intersection with the northern terminus of Cox Road and the southern terminus of Gibbs Road, the highway curves back to the east-northeast. At this intersection, it is just to the northwest of Evans High School. Just west of an intersection with the northern terminus of Galway Drive and the southern terminus of Lake Jean Drive, the highway begins a curve to the east. At the very next intersection, one with the northern terminus of Parkview Drive and the southern terminus of Lawrence Drive, it curves to the east-southeast and meets its northern terminus, an intersection with SR 383 (North Belair Road) in the main part of town. Here, the roadway continues as Towne Centre Drive.

Hereford Farm Road was built in 1965. In 2004, SR 388 was extended along Hereford Farm Road. In 2007, it was removed from Hereford Farm Road.

Towne Centre Drive

Towne Centre Drive is the name for what is essentially an eastern extension of Hereford Farm Road. It is a connector in Evans between Hereford Farm Road and SR 104 (Washington Road) and the western terminus of Riverwatch Parkway. Towne Centre Drive is only a  route. Even though Georgia does not sign its county highways, except for on green street signs, Towne Centre Drive is Columbia County Route 1520 (CR 1520).

The highway begins at an intersection with SR 383 (North Belair Road) and the northern terminus of Hereford Farm Road in Evans and travels to the east-southeast. It passes the Evans campus of University Hospital and then curves to the east-northeast before meeting its northern terminus, an intersection with SR 104 (Washington Road). Here, the roadway continues as Riverwatch Parkway. Towne Centre Drive provides access to local businesses.

See also

References

External links
 

 Georgia Roads (Routes 381 - 399)

388
Transportation in Columbia County, Georgia
State Route 388